Real Emotion may refer to:

 "Real Emotion", a 1993 song by Celine Dion from The Colour of My Love
 "Real Emotion", a 2003 song by Koda Kumi from Grow into One
 Real Emotion (album) by Paper Route